Missingham is a surname. Notable people with the surname include:

Hal Missingham (1906–1994), Australian artist, curator and photographer
Joanne Missingham (born 1994), Australian-born Taiwanese Go player
William Missingham (1868–1933), Australian politician

See also
 Massingham (disambiguation)
 Messingham (disambiguation)